Anne Ravi is an Indian film producer. Started his career as Executive Producer with film like Souryam, Amaravathi (2009 film), Wanted (2011 film) and currently working on Gopichand & A.S Ravi Kumar's Upcoming movie.

Career

2008 - 2010
Ravi Started his career in Telugu film industry with film Souryam As an Executive Producer with Bhavya Creations which started production in late 2007 and released in year 2008. And later made another film Amaravathi (2009 film) with same production house.

2010 - Present
In mid 2010, Bhavya creations announced a film with actor Gopichand title as Wanted and released it in 2011. Ravi kept association with production house for further films like Neeku Naaku Dash Dash and Loukyam which released in 2012 and 2014 respectively. In year 2013, Anne Ravi produced a movie Race (2013 film) and now Anne Ravi is also being part of their upcoming film of A.S Ravi Kumar's Untitled film starring Gopichand

Filmography

As Producer

As Executive Producer

References 

Living people
Indian women film producers
Film producers from Andhra Pradesh
Telugu film producers
Businesswomen from Andhra Pradesh
Year of birth missing (living people)